Route 17, or Highway 17 can refer to the following roads:

For the roads named "A17", see list of A17 roads.

International
 European route E17 
 European route E017

Australia
 Brisbane Valley Highway, Queensland
 D'Aguilar Highway, Queensland

Canada
 Alberta Highway 17
 Alberta Highway 17 (former)
 British Columbia Highway 17
 British Columbia Highway 17A
 Manitoba Highway 17
 Winnipeg Route 17
 New Brunswick Route 17
 Ontario Highway 17
 Prince Edward Island Route 17
 Saskatchewan Highway 17

Costa Rica
 National Route 17

Czech Republic
 I/17 Highway; Czech: Silnice I/17

France
Route nationale 17

India
  National Highway 17 (India)
 State Highway 17 (Kerala)

Iran
 Road 17

Ireland
 N17 road

Italy
 Autostrada A17
 RA 17

Japan
 Japan National Route 17
 Kan-Etsu Expressway

Korea, South
 Iksan–Pyeongtaek Expressway
 Pyeongtaek–Paju Expressway
 National Route 17

New Zealand
 (Former) New Zealand State Highway 17

Paraguay
 National Route 17

Poland 
  Expressway S17
  National road 17

South Africa
 N17 road (South Africa)

United Kingdom
 British A17 (King's Lynn - Newark-on-Trent)

United States
 Interstate 17
 U.S. Route 17
 U.S. Route 17-1
 New England Interstate Route 17 (former)
 Alabama State Route 17
 Arkansas Highway 17
 California State Route 17
 County route A17 (California)
 County Route E17 (California)
 County Route G17 (California)
 County Route J17 (California)
 County Route S17 (California)
 Colorado State Highway 17
 Connecticut Route 17
 Delaware Route 17
 Florida State Road 17
 County Road 17 (Polk County, Florida)
 Georgia State Route 17
 Illinois Route 17
 Indiana State Road 17
 County Road 17 (Elkhart County, Indiana)
 Iowa Highway 17
 K-17 (Kansas highway)
 Kentucky Route 17
 Louisiana Highway 17
 Maine State Route 17
 Maryland Route 17
 Massachusetts Route 17 (former)
 M-17 (Michigan highway)
 Minnesota State Highway 17 (former)
 County Road 17 (Anoka County, Minnesota)
 County Road 17 (Chisago County, Minnesota)
 County Road 17 (Hennepin County, Minnesota)
 County Road 17 (Scott County, Minnesota)
 Mississippi Highway 17
 Missouri Route 17
 Montana Highway 17
 Nebraska Highway 17
 Nevada State Route 17 (former)
 New Jersey Route 17
 County Route 17 (Monmouth County, New Jersey)
 New Mexico State Road 17
 New York State Route 17
 New York State Route 17D (former)
 New York State Route 17G (former)
 New York State Route 17H (1930–1937) (former)
 New York State Route 17H (1940s–1971) (former)
 New York State Route 17J (former)
 New York State Route 17K
 New York State Route 17L (former proposal)
 New York State Route 17M
 County Route 17 (Allegany County, New York)
 County Route 17 (Cattaraugus County, New York)
 County Route 17 (Clinton County, New York)
 County Route 17 (Columbia County, New York)
 County Route 17 (Delaware County, New York)
 County Route 17 (Dutchess County, New York)
 County Route 17 (Essex County, New York)
 County Route 17 (Franklin County, New York)
 County Route 17 (Genesee County, New York)
 County Route 17 (Niagara County, New York)
 County Route 17 (Oneida County, New York)
 County Route 17 (Ontario County, New York)
 County Route 17 (Orange County, New York)
 County Route 17 (Oswego County, New York)
 County Route 17 (Otsego County, New York)
 County Route 17 (Putnam County, New York)
 County Route 17 (Rockland County, New York)
 County Route 17 (Schoharie County, New York)
 County Route 17 (Schuyler County, New York)
 County Route 17 (St. Lawrence County, New York)
 County Route 17 (Steuben County, New York)
 County Route 17 (Suffolk County, New York)
 County Route 17 (Tioga County, New York)
 County Route 17 (Warren County, New York)
 County Route 17 (Washington County, New York)
 County Route 17 (Yates County, New York)
 North Carolina Highway 17 (former)
 North Dakota Highway 17
 Ohio State Route 17
 Oklahoma State Highway 17
 Pennsylvania Route 17
 South Dakota Highway 17
 Tennessee State Route 17
 Texas State Highway 17
 Texas State Highway Loop 17 (former)
 Texas State Highway Spur 17
 Farm to Market Road 17
 Texas Park Road 17
 Utah State Route 17
 Vermont Route 17
 Virginia State Route 17 (former)
 Washington State Route 17
 Primary State Highway 17 (Washington) (former)
 West Virginia Route 17
 Wisconsin Highway 17

Territories
 Guam Highway 17
 Puerto Rico Highway 17

See also
 List of A17 roads
 List of highways numbered 17A
 List of highways numbered 17B
 List of highways numbered 17C
 List of highways numbered 17E
 List of highways numbered 17F
 List of highways numbered 17J
 Highway 17, a location in the video game Half-Life 2